Shojiro Sugiyama (November 16, 1929 – June 25, 2015) was Japanese karate instructor. In 1954, after training in two other styles of karate, he began studying with the Japan Karate Association of Tokyo (Yotsuya). He was invited to come to Chicago, U.S. to teach karate in 1963. Through the late 60's and 70's, Sugiyama Sensei is credited with building and promoting Shotokan karate throughout the entire midwest region. Many of his original students have gone on to create their own dojos throughout Illinois, Iowa, Indiana, Michigan and Wisconsin. In recent years, Sugiyama has increased his focus towards the use and development of ki (Chinese, Qi), in order to improve karate training and create a radar system for martial artists.

Published work

References

 American Samurai, vol. 15, 2006

External links
 Japan Karate Association of Chicago

Japanese male karateka
Shotokan practitioners
2015 deaths
1929 births